The 1980 Trans America Athletic Conference men's basketball tournament (now known as the ASUN men's basketball tournament) was held February 28–March 2, 1980 at the Fant–Ewing Coliseum in Monroe, Louisiana.

 upset top-seeded  in the championship game, 79–77, to win their first TAAC/Atlantic Sun men's basketball tournament. However, the Gentlemen did not ultimately receive a bid to the 1980 NCAA tournament or the 1980 NIT.

Bracket

References

ASUN men's basketball tournament
Tournament
TAAC men's basketball tournament
TAAC men's basketball tournament
TAAC men's basketball tournament